Ematheudes natalensis is a species of snout moth in the genus Ematheudes. It was described by Jay C. Shaffer in 1998 and is known from South Africa.

References

Endemic moths of South Africa
Moths described in 1998
Anerastiini